The 1971–72 season of the European Cup football club tournament was won for the second consecutive time by Ajax, who beat Internazionale in the final. Ajax qualified as the current holders of the European Cup, not as the current national league champion. This was the second year in a row that the European Cup had two Dutch clubs compete.

Bracket

Preliminary round

|}

First leg

Second leg

Valencia won 4–1 on aggregate.

First round

|}

First leg

Second leg

Marseille won 3–2 on aggregate.

Ajax won 2–0 on aggregate.

Grasshopper won 9–1 on aggregate.

Arsenal won 7–1 on aggregate.

2–2 on aggregate; Dinamo București won on away goals.

Feyenoord won 17–0 on aggregate.

Benfica won 7–1 on aggregate.

CSKA Sofia won 4–0 on aggregate.

1–1 on aggregate; Valencia won on away goals.

Újpesti Dózsa won 4–1 on aggregate.

Celtic won 4–2 on aggregate.

Sliema Wanderers won 4–0 on aggregate.

Internazionale won 6–4 on aggregate.

Borussia Mönchengladbach won 7–1 on aggregate.

CSKA Moscow won 4–1 on aggregate.

Standard Liège won 5–2 on aggregate.

Second round

|}

First leg

This game was annulled as Inter player Roberto Boninsegna was hit by a Coca-Cola can in the 29th minute. The first leg game was replayed after the game that was originally scheduled to be second leg was played, thus the order of legs was switched.

Second leg

Ajax won 6–2 on aggregate.

Arsenal won 5–0 on aggregate.

Feyenoord won 5–0 on aggregate.

Benfica won 2–1 on aggregate.

Újpesti Dózsa won 3–1 on aggregate.

Celtic won 7–1 on aggregate.

Internazionale won 4–2 on aggregate.

Standard Liège won 2–1 on aggregate.

Quarter-finals

|}

First leg

Second leg

Ajax won 3–1 on aggregate.

Benfica won 5–2 on aggregate.

Celtic won 3–2 on aggregate.

2–2 on aggregate; Internazionale won on away goals.

Semi-finals

|}

First leg

Second leg

Ajax won 1–0 on aggregate.

0–0 on aggregate; Internazionale won 5–4 on penalties.

During the shoot-out, teams had to take all five penalties even if they could no longer win (the shoot-out would otherwise have ended with a score of 5–3 as Inter went first).

Final

Top scorers

References

External links
1971–72 All matches – season at UEFA website
European Cup results at Rec.Sport.Soccer Statistics Foundation
 All scorers 1971–72 European Cup (excluding preliminary round) according to protocols UEFA
1971-72 European Cup
 European Cup 1971-72 – results, protocols, players statistics
 website eurocups-uefa.ru European Cup 1971-72 – results, protocols
 website Football Archive 1971–72 European Cup

1971–72 in European football
European Champion Clubs' Cup seasons